Julia Görges was the defending champion, but she lost in the semifinals to Ashleigh Barty.

Barty went on to win the title, defeating Wang Qiang in the final, 6–3, 6–4.

Players

Alternates

Draw

Finals

Azalea group

Camellia group

Orchid group

Rose group
{{3TeamRR-TennisWide
| title-1=
|title-2=RR W–L
|title-3=Set W–L
|title-4=Game W–L
|title-5=Standings

| seed-1=4
| team-1-abbrev= 
| team-1= 
| match-w/l-1=1–1
| set-w/l-1=2–2 (50%)
| game-w/l-1=20–17 (54%)
| standings-1=2

| seed-2=5
| team-2-abbrev= 
| team-2=

References

External links
Official Website 
 Singles Draw

WTA Elite Trophy
WTA Elite Trophy
2018 in Chinese tennis